This is a list of Robotboy episodes.

Series overview

Episodes

Season 1 (2005–06)

Season 2 (2007–08)
{| class="wikitable plainrowheaders" style="width:100%; margin:auto;"
! style="background-color: #0000FF; color:white;" | No. inseries
! style="background-color: #0000FF; color:white;" | No. inseason
! style="background-color: #0000FF; color:white;" | Title
! style="background-color: #0000FF; color:white;" | Directed by
! style="background-color: #0000FF; color:white;" | Script by
! style="background-color: #0000FF; color:white;" | UK air date
|-

Robotboy
Robotboy
Episodes